Vice-Admiral  was an admiral in the Imperial Japanese Navy during World War II.

Life and naval career
Niimi was born in what is now Asakita Ward, Hiroshima City, in Hiroshima Prefecture, as the second son to a farming and soy sauce producing family. He entered the Imperial Japanese Naval Academy on 2 December 1905 and graduated from its 36th class on 21 November 1908, ranking 15th out of 191 cadets. He was commissioned an ensign on 15 January 1910 and promoted to sub-lieutenant on 1 December 1911.

He attended naval artillery and torpedo school in 1910, and was then assigned back to the Aso, followed by the destroyer .

Promoted to lieutenant on 1 December 1914, he served on the cruiser , battlecruiser , battleship  and destroyer . He attended the Naval War College (Japan) in 1917, specializing in naval artillery, graduating fourth in his class of 24 on 26 November 1919. He then became chief gunnery officer on the battleship  and was promoted to lieutenant commander on 1 December 1920. He was sent to the United Kingdom as a naval attaché from 1923–1925, during which time he was further promoted to commander on 1 December 1924. In 1922, he wrote a report to the Navy General Staff on the importance of protecting merchant shipping in times of war.

On his return to Japan, he was assigned as executive officer on the cruiser  in 1926. He was promoted to captain on 30 November 1929. On 1 April 1931, he was given his first command: the cruiser .

Niimi was promoted to rear admiral on 15 November 1935. In 1937, he accompanied Prince Chichibu to England for the Coronation Ceremonies of King George VI, afterwards visiting France, Germany and the United States. After serving as chief of staff of the Kure Naval District and of the IJN 2nd Fleet, he was further promoted to vice admiral and Commandant of the Imperial Japanese Naval Academy on 15 November 1939.

On 4 April 1941, he assumed command of the 2nd China Expeditionary Fleet, and was responsible for the naval component of the invasion of Hong Kong, where his duties primarily involved the blockade of Hong Kong harbor with small patrol craft and a couple of light cruisers. He nominally shared the position of Head of Japanese Occupation Forces in Hong Kong with General Takashi Sakai, but his authority was limited to offshore areas.

On 14 July 1942, he became Commander in Chief of the Maizuru Naval District. He retired from active service in March 1944.

Niimi survived the war and died in 1993, aged 106. At his death, he was the last surviving vice-admiral of the Imperial Navy.

References
 Notes

 Books

External links
 

Imperial Japanese Navy admirals
Japanese military personnel of World War I
Japanese admirals of World War II
Japanese occupation of Hong Kong
1887 births
1993 deaths
People from Hiroshima
Military personnel from Hiroshima Prefecture
Japanese centenarians
Men centenarians
20th-century Hong Kong people
20th-century Japanese politicians